Cattleya tenuis (the "slender-stemmed cattleya") is a species of orchid. It shares the rarely used common name of Easter orchid with C. mossiae and C. schroederae.

Natural hybrids :
 Cattleya × tenuata (=  C. elongata × C. tenuis) (Brazil)

References

External links

tenuis
tenuis